MetroCentre, Metro Centre, MetroCenter, or Metro Center may refer to:

City centers
 Metro Center, Springfield, Massachusetts, the original, colonial settlement of the City of Springfield, Massachusetts

Halls
 Metro Hall, a complex of three buildings in Toronto, Ontario, Canada including Metro Hall

Shopping malls
 MetroCentre (shopping centre), a large shopping and leisure centre located in Gateshead, United Kingdom
 Metrocenter Mall (Jackson, Mississippi), a shopping mall in Jackson, Mississippi, USA
 Metrocenter (Phoenix, Arizona), a shopping mall in Phoenix, Arizona, USA

Venues
 MetroCenter (Arlington, Texas), a venue in Arlington, Texas, USA
 Scotiabank Centre (formerly known as the Halifax Metro Centre), a venue in Halifax, Nova Scotia, Canada
 Rockford MetroCentre, a venue in Rockford, Illinois, USA

Railway stations 
 Metro Center station in Washington D.C., US
 MetroCentre railway station in Gateshead, UK
 7th Street/Metro Center station in Los Angeles, California, US